Beyond Beauty: Taiwan from Above is a 2013 documentary film which documents Taiwan completely in aerial photography to underscore the need for environmental reforms. It is directed by aerial photographer Chi Po-lin and produced by Hou Hsiao-hsien, with narration by Wu Nien-jen. The music is composed by Ricky Ho, with three songs written and performed by Nolay Piho (Lin Ching-tai). The film opened on November 1, 2013 at 44 theaters in Taiwan, with Chinese and English subtitles. The film broke the Taiwan box office records for the largest opening weekend and the highest total gross of a locally produced documentary. The film was nominated for Best Documentary and Best Original Film Score at the 50th Golden Horse Awards, winning the best documentary category.

References

Beyond Beauty aerial documentary has Taipei premiere
Beyond Beauty soars to break local box office record
Beyond Beauty soars at Taiwan B.O.
Beyond Beauty becomes highest grossing documentary in Taiwan

External links
 
 

2013 films
Taiwanese documentary films
Films set in Taiwan
Films shot in Taiwan
Aerial photography
Documentary films about environmental issues
Documentary films about Taiwan